The Hanshin Daishōten is a Japanese Grade 2 flat horse race in Japan Thoroughbred colts and fillies aged four and over run over a distance of 3,000 metres at the Hanshin Racecourse, Takarazuka, Hyogo. The race was run in late November or early December until 1987 when it was moved to a date in March. The race now serves as a trial for the spring edition of the Tenno Sho.

It was first run in 1953.

Winners since 1995

Earlier winners

 1953 - Koran
 1954 - Hiya Kiogan
 1955 - Sekai O
 1956 - Dainana Hoshu
 1957 - Top Run
 1958 - Katsura Shuho
 1959 - Tokitsuhiro
 1960 - Yamanin More
 1961 - Helios
 1962 - Motoichi
 1963 - Hikaru Pola
 1964 - Kotaro
 1965 - Chitose O
 1966 - Ryu Pharos
 1967 - Finis
 1968 - Muo
 1969 - Date Hakutaka
 1970 - Speedy Wonder
 1971 - Suin Hoshu
 1972 - Hamano Parade
 1973 - Dicta Boy
 1974 - Kuri Onward
 1975 - Long Hawk
 1976 - Hokuto Boy
 1977 - Takino Chester
 1978 - Captain Namura
 1979 - Fine Dragon
 1980 - Great Titan
 1981 - Arena O
 1982 - Hanki Inari
 1983 - Shin Brown
 1984 - Shin Brown
 1985 - Nishino Raiden
 1986 - Mejiro Boir
 1987 - Suda Hawk
 1988 - Tamamo Cross
 1989 - Namura Mononofu
 1990 - Osumi Shadai
 1991 - Mejiro McQueen
 1992 - Mejiro McQueen
 1993 - Mejiro Palmer
 1994 - Monsieur Siecle

See also
 Horse racing in Japan
 List of Japanese flat horse races

References

Turf races in Japan